Sweat Hotel Live is the second live album by American singer Keith Sweat. It was released by Elektra Records on June 12, 2007.

Critical reception

AllMusic editor Jonathan Widran rated the album two and a half stars out of five. He found that Sweat Hotel Live finds "the R&B singer in fine form on both uptempo grooves and sweet ballads. Backed by a fiery band, Sweat belts out nearly all of his beloved hits, including "I Want Her," "Make It Last Forever," and "I Give All My Love to You." Fans itching for a fix of the New Jack sound in all its glory should give this live set a listen."

Track listing
 "I Want Her"
 "Something Just Ain't Right"
 "Don't Stop Your Love"
 "I'll Give All My Love to You "  (with Monica ) 
 "Lose Control" - Silk
 "Freak Me" - Silk
 "Make It Last Forever"  (with Jackie McGhee ) 
 "Right And A Wrong Way
 "How Deep Is Your Love"
 "Let's Chill" - Charlie Wilson
 "Get Up On It"  (with Kut Klose) 
 "Twisted"  (with Kut Klose) 
 "(There You Go) Tellin' Me No Again" - Akon
 "Just Got Paid" (with Johnny Kemp, Teddy Riley, Charlie Wilson, Silk, Kut Klose And Jackie McGhee)
 "Nobody" (with Athena Cage)

Charts

References

Keith Sweat albums
2007 live albums